(until 1925 Lauchstädt), officially Goethestadt Bad Lauchstädt, is a town in the district Saalekreis, Saxony-Anhalt, Germany, 13 km southwest of Halle. Population 8,781 (2020).

Lauchstädt was a popular watering-place in the 18th century, the dukes of Saxe-Merseburg often making it their summer residence. From 1789 to 1811 the Weimar court theatrical company gave performances here of the plays of Friedrich Schiller and Johann Wolfgang von Goethe, an attraction which greatly contributed to the well-being of the town. During the 19th century, its industries included malting, vinegar-making and brewing.

In January 2008, Bad Lauchstädt incorporated the former municipalities Schafstädt, Delitz am Berge and Klobikau. On 1 January 2010 Milzau was also incorporated, disbanding the Verwaltungsgemeinschaft Bad Lauchstädt. Bad Lauchstädt, Delitz am Berge, Klobikau, Milzau and Schafstädt are now Ortschaften or municipal divisions of the town Bad Lauchstädt.

Notable people
 August Förster (1828–1889), actor
 Klaus-Jürgen Grünke (born 1951), cyclist
 Carlo Thränhardt (born 1957), high jumper

References

Saalekreis